Eric of Brunswick-Grubenhagen (1478 – 14 May 1532 in Fürstenau) was from 1508 to 1532 prince-bishop of Paderborn and Osnabrück. In 1532, he was elected bishop of Münster, however, he died before he could be consecrated.

Life 
Eric was the youngest son of the Duke Albert II, Duke of Brunswick-Grubenhagen and his wife, Countess Elizabeth of Waldeck. While his elder brother Philip inherited the principality of Grubenhagen from his father, Eric was destined according to the customs of the era for a career in the clergy.  After studying in Rome he became canon at the cathedrals in Münster and Paderborn.  Eric was elected prince-bishop of Paderborn and Osnabrück and his election was confirmed by Pope Julius II on 20 April 1509.  However, Emperor Maximilian I refused to acknowledge him as prince and even outlawed him, because of an outstanding tax debt.  Eric received imperial recognition only on 2 April 1521, from Emperor Charles V.

The Reformation started during his term in office.  However, it hardly affected Eric, neither theologically, nor in his role as worldly ruler.  He remained faithful to the Catholic doctrine himself, and did not have any disputes with his Lutheran neighbours, nor with the Lutheran citizens of the cities in his Prince-bishopric.  He kept an open mind, and granted many exemptions to the Lutherans in his territory.  In the Roman Catholic literature his stance on religious matters is described as ambiguous, because he witnessed the wedding of a former Benedictine nun from Kaufungen.

In 1532, Frederick III of Wied resigned as Prince-Bishop of Münster and Eric III was elected as his successor.  This would have meant that the three prince-bishoprics in Westphalia would be united in a personal union.  However, Eric died unexpectedly on 14 May 1532, during a banquet in Fürstenau to celebrate his election in Münster with his noble friends.

References

External links 
 Eintrag auf catholic-hierarchy.org

16th-century German Roman Catholic bishops
Eric 02
Eric 03
Roman Catholic bishops of Paderborn
Old House of Brunswick
1478 births
1532 deaths
Prince-Bishops of Paderborn